Raven De La Croix (born Lynn Christie Martin; August 24, 1947) is an American actress and stripper known for her lead role in the 1976 Russ Meyer film Up!. When Meyer first discovered her at Joe Allen's, a hangout in West Hollywood, California, she had no acting experience. In 2011, Owen Gleiberman wrote that she "...may be [Meyer's] most spectacular siren". She is the granddaughter of aviation pioneer Lieutenant William Knox Martin.

Biography 
De La Croix was born as Lynn Christie Martin in Manhattan, New York City to a poor family and was the oldest of eight children. Her father was Comanche and her mother French-American. She was a licensed nurse and worked for a time at the Columbia Presbyterian Hospital. She also worked several other jobs, including prison drug lecturer where she was seen by a prisoner who later recommended her to work for a theatrical agency. Later, she was noticed in a Hollywood restaurant by a talent scout for Eddie Foy, Jr., which eventually led to an appointment with Russ Meyer. De La Croix also worked at the Melody Burlesk in New York as a stripper.

Her first marriage was abusive. The August 1986 issue of Wrestling Eye Magazine notes on page 48 that, "a recent article in Rock Island, Illinois QUAD TIMES reported she was engaged to wrestler Greg The Hammer Valentine".

Filmography

Films

Television

References

Citations

Sources

External links
 

1947 births
American film actresses
Living people
American people of Comanche descent
Native American actresses
Actresses from New York City
21st-century American women